Kaligandaki Corridor is an under construction 435 km long highway in Nepal starting from Sunauli, the southern part near the Indian border, and ending at Korala, the northern part near the Chinese border. It is one of the National Pride Projects. After the completion, about 1 million people of 10 districts will have direct access to motorable road. The road is also predicted to become a trading route between Nepal, India and China.

The route passes though Terai, Midhills and Himalayan mountains. Main locality includes Palpa, Syangja, Parbat, Baglung and Muktinath.

The road is being constructed by multiple contractors, including Nepal Army’s Road Construction Division. The project was started on 3 December 2018 and scheduled for completion by December, 2021.

See also
List of roads in Nepal
National Pride Projects

References

Highways in Nepal